Promoted to Glory is a term used by The Salvation Army to describe the death of a Salvationist.

Terminology and background

Earliest printed usage of the term seems to be in late 1882 in The War Cry, which included death announcements in the December 14 issue, with headlines such as 'Promotion of Sister Muxlow from Earth to Heaven' and 'Private Rudd goes to Glory from the Open-air.' Another report, headed 'Promotion from Cheltenham to Glory,' appeared in The War Cry of December 16, 1882.

Some Salvation Army corps have a Promoted to Glory Board or ledger on which all members (Soldiers or Adherents) of that corps, who have died, are listed along with the year of their death. The Salvation Army flag may be draped over the coffin.

The term Promoted to Glory was actually coined by Herbert Booth, son of the Founder William Booth, following the death of Catherine Booth, the Mother of the Salvation Army.  He wrote the song "Promoted to Glory" which is still used at funerals today.

Words & Music: Herbert H. Booth, in Songs of Peace and War, 1890 (MIDI, score). Booth wrote this song while preparing for his mother's funeral.

Song

Summoned home, the call has sounded,

Bidding a soldier his warfare cease;

And the song of angels resounded,

Welcomes a warrior to eternal peace.

Praise the Lord! from earthly struggles

A comrade has found release.

Death has lost its sting, the grave its victory;

Conflicts and dangers are over;

See him honored in the throne of glory,

Crowned by the hand of Jehovah!

Strife and sorrow over,

The Lord's true faithful soldier

Has been called to go from the ranks below,

To the conq’ring host above.

Once the sword, but now the scepter,

Once the fight, now the rest and fame,

Broken every earthly fetter,

Now the glory for the cross and shame;

Once the loss of all for Jesus,

But now the eternal gain.

Trials and sorrow here have found their meaning

Mysteries their explanation;

Safe, forever in the sunlight gleaming

Of His eternal salvation.

Salvation Army funerals are typically upbeat and are a celebration of the words "Servant of Christ, well done!"

References

The Salvation Army
Christian terminology